Willis Jacox (born March 25, 1966 in Bloomington, Minnesota) is a former professional American football player.

Jacox attended the University of North Dakota in the mid-1980s, where he played both wide receiver and kick returner.  Following his collegiate career, Jacox was signed by the Saskatchewan Roughriders of the Canadian Football League in May 1987.  He played for the Roughriders in parts of the 1987, 1991 and 1992 CFL seasons, leading the league in kickoff return yards (1,231 yds) in 1991.

After his CFL career ended, Jacox played in the Arena Football League as a wide receiver for the Iowa Barnstormers. He was named Second Team All-Arena in 1996.

External links
AFL stats
Just Sports Stats

1966 births
Living people
People from Bloomington, Minnesota
American football wide receivers
American football return specialists
University of North Dakota alumni
North Dakota Fighting Hawks football players
Players of American football from Minnesota
American players of Canadian football
Canadian football return specialists
Saskatchewan Roughriders players
Iowa Barnstormers players
Sportspeople from the Minneapolis–Saint Paul metropolitan area
National Football League replacement players